Lamar Consolidated High School is a grades 9–12 school located in Rosenberg, Texas, United States. The school, which serves the City of Richmond, parts of Rosenberg, and unincorporated areas of Fort Bend County, is a part of the Lamar Consolidated Independent School District (LCISD). All areas served by LCHS are within the Houston metropolitan area.

In 2005–06, this school was rated "Acceptable" by the Texas Education Agency.

Facts

First opened in 1948.
student body: 1679.
Percent of graduates: 75 percent (not including drop-outs before senior year)
The 2010-2012 UIL realignment places LCHS in district 23-4A, along with El Campo, Bay City, Terry, Foster, Angleton, and Brazosport.
The psychological thriller "Apart" was filmed in Lamar Consolidated High School, along with its football field, Traylor Stadium. Some scenes were also filmed at Foster High School.
The school's lone state football championship is chronicled in Dr. Brent Melloy's book, UNHERALDED: How Jacquizz Rodgers led the 2007 Lamar Consolidated Mustangs to an improbable Texas State Championship. 

It includes sections of Rosenberg and areas within the city limits of Richmond. Previously the boundary included Greatwood, and Kendleton.

Feeder schools

Junior high school
Lamar Junior High School

Middle school
Wessendorff Middle School

Elementary schools
Arredondo Elementary School
Austin Elementary School1
T.L. Pink Elementary School1
Jane Long Elementary School1
Deaf Smith Elementary School1
Irma Dru Hutchison Elementary School1
Beasley Elementary School

1These are the elementary schools that are entirely zoned to Lamar Consolidated High School.

Athletics

Football
2007 Texas 4A State Champions
2006 Texas 4A State Semifinalist

Lamar Consolidated Baseball
9 District Championships
22 Playoff Appearances

Basketball

Notable alumni

Sports
Burt Lancon - Olympic figure skater, 6th place in 1984 Winter Olympics
Lance Zierlein - Sports talk show host on KMBE 790 AM in Houston, Texas

NFL
Antoine Everett - former NFL offensive lineman for the Tampa Bay Buccaneers & Pittsburgh Steelers
Alan Faneca – 9-time Pro Bowler (2001-2009), 2021 NFL hall of fame inductee, 8-time All-Pro (2001-2008) NFL offensive lineman for Arizona Cardinals, Pittsburgh Steelers and New York Jets, Super Bowl XL champion
Donald Hollas – former NFL quarterback for Cincinnati Bengals and Oakland Raiders
Pierce Holt – former NFL defensive lineman, 1992 Pro Bowler and 2nd-team All-Pro for San Francisco 49ers
Earnest Jackson – 2-time Pro Bowl (1984, 1986) NFL running back for San Diego Chargers, Philadelphia Eagles and Pittsburgh Steelers
Bobby Jancik - former NFL cornerback for the Houston Oilers
Michael Lewis – 2004 Pro Bowler NFL, safety of Philadelphia Eagles and San Francisco 49ers
Jacquizz Rodgers - running back for Tampa Bay Buccaneers
James Rodgers - wide receiver for CFL's Montreal Alouettes

MLB
 Randal Grichuk - MLB outfielder for the Toronto Blue Jays and later traded to the Colorado Rockies.
 Jimmie Lee Solomon - Major League Baseball Executive Vice President of Baseball Operations 2005-2010

Music
B. J. Thomas – singer-songwriter, known for "Raindrops Keep Fallin' on My Head," "Hooked on a Feeling," "Somebody Done Somebody Wrong Song," and "As Long As We Got Each Other,"  the theme song from Growing Pains
John Holiday - operatic countertenor who has appeared in supporting and leading roles with several American opera companies

References

External links

 
Lamar Athletics

Educational institutions established in 1949
Lamar Consolidated Independent School District high schools
Rosenberg, Texas
1949 establishments in Texas